Castel Sant'Angelo is a  (municipality) in the Province of Rieti in the Italian region of Lazio, located about  northeast of Rome and about  east of Rieti.

Castel Sant'Angelo borders the following municipalities: Borgo Velino, Cittaducale, Micigliano, Rieti.

The Lake of Cutilia is located in the frazione of Vasche.

Transport 
Castel Sant'Angelo has a station on the Terni–Sulmona railway, with trains to Terni, Rieti and L'Aquila.

Cities and towns in Lazio